UnxUtils is a collection of ports of common GNU Unix-like utilities to native Win32, with executables only depending on the Microsoft C-runtime msvcrt.dll. The collection was last updated externally on April 15, 2003, by Karl M. Syring. The most recent release package available  was an open-source project, UnxUtils at SourceForge, with the latest binary release in March, 2007 (though the files within are dated from the year 2000).  The independent distribution included a main zip archive (UnxUtils.zip, 3,365,638 bytes) complemented by more recent updates (UnxUpdates.zip, 878,847 bytes, brought some binaries up to year 2003), but the SourceForge project has no UnxUpdates.zip package. An alternative source of Unix-like utilities for Windows is GnuWin32; it has later versions of many programs, but requires supporting files (e.g. DLLs) in many cases.

The utilities included are:

agrep.exe
ansi2knr.exe
basename.exe
bc.exe
bison.exe
bunzip2.exe
bzip2.exe
bzip2recover.exe
cat.exe
chgrp.exe
chmod.exe
chown.exe
cksum.exe
cmp.exe
comm.exe
compress.exe
cp.exe
csplit.exe
cut.exe
date.exe
dc.exe
dd.exe
df.exe
diff.exe
diff3.exe
dircolors.exe
dirname.exe
du.exe
echo.exe
egrep.exe
env.exe
expand.exe
expr.exe
factor.exe
fgrep.exe
find.exe
flex.exe
fmt.exe
fold.exe
fsplit.exe
gawk.exe
gclip.exe
gplay.exe
grep.exe
gsar.exe
gunzip.exe
gzip.exe
head.exe
id.exe
indent.exe
install.exe
join.exe
jwhois.exe
less.exe
lesskey.exe
ln.exe
logname.exe
ls.exe
m4.exe
make.exe
makedepend.exe
makemsg.exe
man.exe
md5sum.exe
mkdir.exe
mkfifo.exe
mknod.exe
mv.exe
mvdir.exe
nl.exe
od.exe
paste.exe
patch.exe
pathchk.exe
pclip.exe
pr.exe
printenv.exe
printf.exe
ptx.exe
pwd.exe
recode.exe
rm.exe
rman.exe
rmdir.exe
sdiff.exe
sed.exe
seq.exe
sh.exe
sha1sum.exe
shar.exe
sleep.exe
sort.exe
split.exe
stego.exe
su.exe
sum.exe
sync.exe
tac.exe
tail.exe
tar.exe
tee.exe
test.exe
touch.exe
tr.exe
tsort.exe
type.exe
uname.exe
unexpand.exe
uniq.exe
unrar.exe
unshar.exe
unzip.exe
uudecode.exe
uuencode.exe
wc.exe
wget.exe
which.exe
whoami.exe
xargs.exe
yes.exe
zcat.exe
zip.exe
zsh.exe

See also

Cygwin
GNU Core Utilities
GnuWin32
Interix
List of Unix commands
Microsoft Windows Services for UNIX
MinGW
MKS Toolkit

External links

source and binaries
older UnxUtils home page at SourceForge
Dr. Karl Syring's home page
Shunix/K93 Unix - standard UNIX utilities written in Korn Shell, a SourceForge project
wintools packaging project at sourceforge.net

Free system software
Windows-only free software